In chess, the Kieseritzky Gambit is an opening line in the King's Gambit It begins with the moves:
1. e4 e5
2. f4 exf4
3. Nf3 g5
4. h4 g4
5. Ne5

Following Black's attempt to hold the sacrificed pawn by 3...g5, White reacts by immediately undermining the pawn chain. It is one of the main lines of the King's Gambit after 3...g5, and its overall assessment is still unclear but approximately equal. The Encyclopaedia of Chess Openings classifies the Kieseritzky Gambit under code C39. C39 is also the code for the Allgaier Gambit, in which White plays 5.Ng5?!, sacrificing the knight for an attack after 5...h6 6.Nxf7 Kxf7. The Allgaier Gambit is considered dubious by modern theory.

History
The opening now known as the Kieseritzky Gambit was first described by Polerio in the late 16th century. Greco also included a game with this opening in his 1620 collection. It was also analyzed by Salvio (1604) and Philidor (1749). In the first edition of the Handbuch in 1843, 5.Ne5 was considered under the heading of the Allgaier Gambit, but the editors noted that Kieseritzky had contributed significantly to the theory of 5.Ne5, which they advocated as superior to 5.Ng5 (an opinion shared by almost all subsequent analysts). The corresponding chapter in the second edition of the Handbuch in 1852 was headed "Allgaier and Kieseritzky's Gambit". Subsequently the name Kieseritzky Gambit came into general use for 5.Ne5, Allgaier Gambit being used exclusively for 5.Ng5.

Main Line

5...Nf6 6.Bc4 
Although both the bishop on c4 and the knight on e5 target the pawn on f7, if Black does not protect the pawn, the threat is typically Bxf7+ rather than Nxf7. 6.d4 has been tried as well, although it is regarded by some to be inferior to 6.Bc4.

6...d5 7.exd5 Bd6 
The other main move is 7...Bg7.

See also
 List of chess openings
 List of chess openings named after people

Notes

References

Bibliography

  

Chess openings